Apocaulon is a genus of flowering plants belonging to the family Rutaceae.

Its native range is Southern Venezuela.

Species:

Apocaulon carnosum

References

Zanthoxyloideae
Zanthoxyloideae genera